Aukland or Augland is a village in the municipality of Lindesnes in Agder county, Norway.

Name
Aukland derives from auke — augeland, which can be translated into increase of land or expansion of hayfields. After hay was cut, farmers in Tryland rowed up the hay, and thus, increase their land, because Augland farm is likely secreted from Tryland.

References 

Villages in Agder
Lindesnes